Agordat; also Akordat or Ak'ordat) is a city in Gash-Barka, Eritrea. It was the capital of the former Barka province, which was situated between the present-day Gash-Barka and Anseba regions.

History
Excavations in Agordat uncovered pottery related to the C-Group (Temehu) pastoral culture, which inhabited the Nile Valley between 2500 and 1500 BC. Sherds akin to those of the Kerma culture, another community that flourished in the Nile Valley around the same period, were also found at other local archaeological sites in the Barka valley belonging to the Gash Group.

Agordat was the last major town along the Eritrean Railway to Massawa through Asmara. The line continued on through to Bishia, its terminus. The local economy is reliant on passing traders moving between Asmara and Kessela in Sudan.

Overview
Agordat lies in the western part of the country on the Barka River. An important market town and it also home to a large mosque. Agordat has many restaurants, as well as a hospital built during the colonial period in Italian Eritrea. A considerable amount of Eritrea's fruit and vegetables, particularly bananas and oranges, are transported through the town. Additionally, the Akat fruit is grown locally.

Climate

See also

History of Eritrea
Battle of Agordat (1941)
First Battle of Agordat
Second Battle of Agordat
Italian cruiser Agordat

References

Gash-Barka Region
Populated places in Eritrea